Valaire is a commune of the Loir-et-Cher department in central France.

The Zen Temple La Gendronniere, founded by Taisen Deshimaru, occupies 80 hectares of land in the north-western part of the commune.

Population

See also
Communes of the Loir-et-Cher department

References

Communes of Loir-et-Cher